Cybistrini is a tribe of predaceous diving beetles in the family Dytiscidae. There are 7 genera and 128 described extant species in Cybistrini. The same set is also called Cybistrinae by authors viewing is as a subfamily of Dytiscidae.

Genera
These seven genera belong to the tribe Cybistrini:
 Austrodytes Watts, 1978
 Cybister Curtis, 1827
 Megadytes Sharp, 1882
 Onychohydrus Schaum & White, 1847
 Regimbartina Chatanay, 1911
 Spencerhydrus Sharp, 1882
 Sternhydrus Brinck, 1945

References

Further reading

External links

 

Dytiscidae
Articles created by Qbugbot